is a city park located in the city of Kan'onji, Kagawa Prefecture, Japan on the island of Shikoku. It is located within the borders of the Setonaikai National Park. The park is famous for its  (lit. 'coin-shaped sand-drawing'), dating in origins to 1633 when it was created by the local people to greet their new daimyō Ikoma Takatoshi;  Its gardens were designed by gardener Ozawa Keijiro and are noted for cherry blossoms, azaleas, wisteria, and camellias.

Kotohiki Park opened as a prefectural park in 1897. It was nationally designated as a Place of Scenic Beauty in 1936.

See also

 List of Places of Scenic Beauty of Japan (Kagawa)
 Koto

References

Parks and gardens in Kagawa Prefecture
Places of Scenic Beauty
Kan'onji, Kagawa